Barn is the 41st studio album by Canadian-American singer-songwriter Neil Young and his 14th with Crazy Horse. The album was released on December 10, 2021, by Reprise Records. A stand-alone film of the same name directed by Young's wife Daryl Hannah was also released for streaming and on Blu-ray.

Critical reception 

Reviewing in his Substack-published "Consumer Guide" column, Robert Christgau gave Barn an "A" and declared it the first worthwhile album of new Young songs since 2009's Fork in the Road. In comparison to that album, he said that "Crazy Horse is quieter and gentler [here] as the green consciousness their boss embraced as of 2003's Greendale turns ever more militant and also, unfortunately but fittingly, much darker". Among the highlights in Christgau's mind were "Canerican", "Change Ain't Never Gonna", "Human Race", "Tumblin' Through the Years", and "Don't Forget Love", although he was most impressed by "Welcome Back", calling it a "full-bore astonishment" whose sincerity is evinced in Young's guitar, "so quiet and caring it feels like love". He ultimately named it the best album of 2021.

Writing for PopMatters, John Amen gave the project a 7/10, concluding, "Their navigations of sublimity vs. subtlety, maximalism vs. spaciousness, and free improvisation vs. precise composition are like inexhaustible stylistic lodes ...."

Track listing
"Song of the Seasons" – 6:04
"Heading West" – 3:22
"Change Ain't Never Gonna" – 2:53
"Canerican" – 3:12
"Shape of You" – 2:55
"They Might Be Lost" – 4:32
"Human Race" – 4:14
"Tumblin' Thru the Years" – 3:19
"Welcome Back" – 8:28
"Don't Forget Love" – 3:48

Personnel
Neil Young 
Nils Lofgren
Billy Talbot
Ralph Molina

Charts

Weekly charts

Year-end charts

References

2021 albums
Crazy Horse (band) albums
Neil Young albums
Albums produced by Niko Bolas
Albums produced by Neil Young
Reprise Records albums